Cameron Menzies (born 27 June 1989) is a Scottish darts player who plays in events of the Professional Darts Corporation (PDC).

Career

BDO

Menzies first played darts on the BDO circuit in 2006, playing in the Gibraltar Open. However, he did not emerge to prominence until 2016 where he won the British Open. He played in the 2016 World Masters but lost to Irish darts player John O'Shea in the last 80. In 2017 he became the first Scottish player to win the Scottish Open in 10 years when Gary Anderson won it. He qualified for the 2017 BDO World Trophy through the regional qualifiers. He reached the semi-finals of the 2017 World Masters before losing to eventual champion Krzysztof Ratajski. Later in 2017 he reached the final TV-stages of the Grand Slam of Darts (staged by PDC), eventually losing out to Berry van Peer.

PDC

Menzies entered the PDC 2018 Q-School after his early loss at the 2018 BDO World Darts Championship. He then qualified for the first PDC European Tour event of the year, the European Darts Open in Leverkusen and beat Mark Wilson 6-2 in the first round, before losing to the eventual champion Michael van Gerwen.

Menzies won one Challenge Tour event in 2018.

He won two challenge tour titles in 2019 after again failing to secure a tour card at Q-School.

Personal life
Menzies is a keeper for senior footballing side Lugar Boswell Thistle. As of 2022, Menzies lives in Milton Keynes with his partner, and fellow darts player, Fallon Sherrock where he works as a plumber.

World Championship results

BDO/WDF
 2018: First round (lost to Conan Whitehead 1–3)
 2022: Semi-finals (lost to Thibault Tricole 4–5)

PDC
 2023: Second round (lost to Vincent van der Voort 0–3)

Performance timeline 

PDC European Tour

References

External links

1989 births
Scottish darts players
Living people
British Darts Organisation players
Professional Darts Corporation current tour card holders